Lucio Fregona (born 21 January 1964) is a former Italian male mountain runner who won 1995 World Mountain Running Championships.

Biography
With 12 participation in the World championships (1986, 1988-1990, 1992-1993, 1995-1999, 2001), he is the second Italian after Marco De Gasperi with 15. He also won one national championships at individual senior level.

World championships team results
 short distance: 1988, 1989, 1990 (3)
 long distance: 1995, 1996, 1997, 1998, 1999, 2001 (6)
 short distance: 1986, 1992

National titles
Italian Mountain Running Championships
Mountain running: 1996

References

External links
 

1964 births
Living people
Italian male mountain runners
World Mountain Running Championships winners
20th-century Italian people